Alan Coldham (1906–1996) was an Australian tennis player who later settled in England.
He also played golf. Coldham was national junior tennis champion of Australia in 1924 and 1925. Coldham first entered the Australasian championships in 1925, when he lost in round one to Rice Gemmell. In 1926 he lost early to Pat O'Hara Wood, but gained his revenge on O'Hara Wood the following year by beating the twice former champion. It was a match that contained many good rallies. Coldham went for his shots and often came to the net to finish off points and ran O'Hara Wood all over the court. Coldham lost in the quarter finals to Jack Hawkes. In 1930 Coldham beat Hawkes (who hadn't played much before the event and was out of condition) but lost in round three to Jack Clemenger. In the 1930s, Coldham settled in England. Coldham married Eileen Eveleigh-de Moleyns (daughter of Hon. John Eveleigh-de Moleyns) in 1939 and they lived in Osterley, London. Coldham made his debut at Wimbledon in 1936, losing in round two to Josef Caska. In 1937 he lost in round two to Andre Lacroix and in 1938 lost in round one to Owen Anderson. In 1939 he lost in the Wimbledon second round to Alejo Russell. He lost in round two in 1946 and round one in 1947. He made his last appearance in 1948, losing in round two to Cyril Kemp.

References

1906 births
1996 deaths
Australian male tennis players
Tennis people from Victoria (Australia)
Grand Slam (tennis) champions in boys' singles
Australian Championships (tennis) junior champions
Australian emigrants to the United Kingdom
20th-century Australian people